Elitserien for bandy in 2007–08 was the first season of the "new" Elitserien, replacing the former Allsvenskan and Elitserien.

League table

Knock-out stage
A best-of-three playoff were used in the quarter-finals and best-of-five in the semi-finals. The crucial final for the Swedish Championship was played at Studenternas IP in Uppsala on 15 March 2008.

Final

Season statistics

Top scorers

References 

Elitserien (bandy) seasons
Bandy
Bandy
Elitserien
Elitserien